Nemophila pulchella, known by the common name Eastwood's baby blue-eyes, is a species of flowering plant in the borage family. It is endemic to California, where it is found from the San Francisco Bay Area to the southern Sierra Nevada to the Transverse Ranges. It grows in many types of mountain, foothill, and valley habitats.

Description
Nemophila pulchella is an annual herb with a fleshy and delicate stem. The leaves are up to 5 centimeters long and generally divided into five wide, rounded lobes. Flowers are solitary, each on a pedicel up to 3 centimeters in length. The flower has a calyx of hairy, pointed sepals. The bowl-shaped flower corolla is white or blue, the largest just over a centimeter wide.

There are three varieties. 
Frémont's baby blue-eyes, var. fremontii, has white flowers, as does 
var. gracilis, which is endemic to the Sierra Nevada foothills
var. pulchella has blue flowers with white centers.

External links
Jepson Manual Treatment - Nemophila pulchella
Nemophila pulchella Photo gallery

pulchella
Endemic flora of California
Flora of the Sierra Nevada (United States)
Natural history of the California chaparral and woodlands
Natural history of the California Coast Ranges
Natural history of the Peninsular Ranges
Natural history of the San Francisco Bay Area
Natural history of the Santa Monica Mountains
Natural history of the Transverse Ranges
Flora without expected TNC conservation status